Follow Your Heart (Va’ dove ti porta il cuore) is a book written by Susanna Tamaro in 1994, originally published in Italian by Baldini & Castoldi. The book has been translated into 18 languages, including English.

Plot 
This book is an epistolary novel in which an elderly woman writes letters to her granddaughter who has left Italy for America. She writes about the poor choices she has made, which have led to several lives being ruined.

References 

1994 novels
20th-century Italian novels
Italian-language novels